The list of compositions by Johann Joachim Quantz was established by Horst Augsbach. QV stands for "Quantz Verzeichnis", and Anh. for "Anhang" (supplement) when the authenticity of the works is spurious.

Flute sonatas

The numbering follows the Catalogue des solos pour Sans Souci started in 1763 and continued in 1769 by the Catalogue des solos pour le Nouveau Palais that contains works of both Quantz and his student Frederick II, King of Prussia. These two catalogues start at number 88. The previous Catalogue des solos pour Potsdam containing sonatas Nos. 1–87 was lost. The sonatas by Quantz are numbered as follows: 88–105, 142, 219–254 & 265–361. The 121 sonatas by Frederick II are: 106–141, 143–218 & 255–264. The sonatas with a Roman numeral numbering are part of the collection Sonata a flauto traverso solo e cembalo da Gio: Gioacchino Quantz.

 QV 1: 1 – Flute Sonata No. 360 in C major
 QV 1: 2 – Flute Sonata No. 284 in C major
 QV 1: 3 – Flute Sonata No. 346 in C major
 QV 1: 4 – Flute Sonata No. 241 in C major
 QV 1: 5a – Flute Sonata No. 91 in C major
 QV 1: 5b – Flute Sonata XVII in C major
 QV 1: 6 – Flute Sonata No. 226 in C major
 QV 1: 7 – Movement of Flute Sonata in C major
 QV 1: 8 – Flute Sonata No. 312 in C major
 QV 1: 9 – Flute Sonata No. 95 in C major
 QV 1: 10 – Flute Sonata No. 332 in C major
 QV 1: 11 – Flute Sonata No. 319 in C major
 QV 1: 12 – Flute Sonata No. 268 in C major
 QV 1: 13 – Flute Sonata No. 298 in C major
 QV 1: 14 – Flute Sonata No. 305 in C minor
 QV 1: 15 – Flute Sonata III in C minor
 QV 1: 16 – Flute Sonata in C minor, Op. 1 No. 3
 QV 1: 17 – Flute Sonata X in C minor
 QV 1: 18 – Flute Sonata No. 276 in C minor
 QV 1: 19 – Flute Sonata No. 339 in C minor
 QV 1: 20 – Flute Sonata No. 353 in C minor
 QV 1: 21 – Flute Sonata No. 291 in C minor
 QV 1: 22 – Flute Sonata No. 325 in C minor
 QV 1: 23 – Flute Sonata No. 250 in C minor
 QV 1: 24 – Flute Sonata XII in D major
 QV 1: 25 – Flute Sonata in D major
 QV 1: 26 – Flute Sonata No. 292 in D major
 QV 1: 27 – Flute Sonata No. 242 in D major
 QV 1: 28 – Flute Sonata No. 251 in D major
 QV 1: 29 – Flute Sonata No. 299 in D major
 QV 1: 30 – Flute Sonata No. 313 in D major
 QV 1: 31 – Flute Sonata No. 354 in D major
 QV 1: 32 – Flute Sonata No. 269 in D major
 QV 1: 33 – Flute Sonata No. 219 in D major
 QV 1: 34 – Flute Sonata No. 333 in D major
 QV 1: 35 – Flute Sonata No. 247 in D major
 QV 1: 36 – Flute Sonata No. 340 in D major
 QV 1: 37a – Flute Sonata IV in D major
 QV 1: 37b – Flute Sonata No. 227 in D major
 QV 1: 38 – Flute Sonata No. 326 in D major
 QV 1: 39 – Flute Sonata No. 361 in D major
 QV 1: 40 – Flute Sonata No. 92 in D major
 QV 1: 41 – Flute Sonata No. 228 in D major
 QV 1: 42 – Flute Sonata No. 277 in D major
 QV 1: 43 – Flute Sonata No. 96 in D major
 QV 1: 44 – Flute Sonata No. 245 in D major
 QV 1: 45 – Flute Sonata No. 347 in D major
 QV 1: 46 – Flute Sonata No. 285 in D major
 QV 1: 47 – Flute Sonata No. 306 in D major
 QV 1: 48 – Flute Sonata in D major, Op. 1 No. 4
 QV 1: 49 – Flute Sonata in D major, Op. 1 No. 6
 QV 1: 50 – Flute Sonata No. 341 in E flat major
 QV 1: 51 – Flute Sonata No. 270 in E flat major
 QV 1: 52 – Flute Sonata No. 327 in E flat major
 QV 1: 53 – Movement of Flute Sonata in E flat major
 QV 1: 54 – Flute Sonata No. 348 in E flat major
 QV 1: 55 – Flute Sonata No. 286 in E flat major
 QV 1: 56 – Flute Sonata No. 94 in E flat major
 QV 1: 57 – Flute Sonata V in E flat major
 QV 1: 58a – Flute Sonata No. 98 in E flat major
 QV 1: 58b – Flute Sonata XVIII in E flat major
 QV 1: 59 – Flute Sonata No. 279 in E flat major
 QV 1: 60 – Flute Sonata No. 300 in E flat major
 QV 1: 61 – Flute Sonata No. 334 in E major
 QV 1: 62 – Flute Sonata No. 93 in E major
 QV 1: 63 – Flute Sonata No. 223 in E major
 QV 1: 64 – Flute Sonata No. 229 in E major
 QV 1: 65 – Flute Sonata No. 307 in E major
 QV 1: 66 – Flute Sonata No. 97 in E minor
 QV 1: 67 – Flute Sonata No. 355 in E minor
 QV 1: 68 – Flute Sonata No. 103 in E minor
 QV 1: 69 – Flute Sonata No. 220 in E minor
 QV 1: 70 – Flute Sonata No. 314 in E minor
 QV 1: 71 – Flute Sonata No. 101 in E minor
 QV 1: 72 – Flute Sonata No. 278 in E minor
 QV 1: 73 – Flute Sonata No. 252 in E minor
 QV 1: 74 – Flute Sonata No. 243 in E minor
 QV 1: 75 – Flute Sonata No. 234 in E minor
 QV 1: 76 – Flute Sonata No. 318 in E minor
 QV 1: 77 – Flute Sonata in E minor, Op. 1 No. 5
 QV 1: 78 – Flute Sonata No. 293 in E minor
 QV 1: 79 – Flute Sonata No. 320 in E minor
 QV 1: 80 – Flute Sonata No. 335 in F major
 QV 1: 81 – Flute Sonata No. 294 in F major
 QV 1: 82 – Flute Sonata No. 356 in F major
 QV 1: 83 – Flute Sonata No. 253 in F major
 QV 1: 84 – Flute Sonata XVIIII in F major
 QV 1: 85 – Flute Sonata No. 321 in F major
 QV 1: 86 – Flute Sonata XIII in F major
 QV 1: 87 – Flute Sonata No. 301 in F major
 QV 1: 88 – Flute Sonata No. 287 in F major
 QV 1: 89 – Flute Sonata No. 349 in F major
 QV 1: 90 – Flute Sonata No. 308 in F major
 QV 1: 91 – Flute Sonata No. 280 in F major
 QV 1: 92 – Flute Sonata No. 328 in F major
 QV 1: 93 – Flute Sonata No. 272 in F major
 QV 1: 94 – Flute Sonata No. 342 in F major
 QV 1: 95 – Flute Sonata VI in F minor
 QV 1: 96 – Flute Sonata No. 89 in G major
 QV 1: 97 – Flute Sonata No. 238 in G major
 QV 1: 98 – Variations on Ich schlief da träumte mir in G major
 QV 1: 99 – Flute Sonata No. 225 in G major
 QV 1:100 – Flute Sonata No. 244 in G major
 QV 1:101 – Flute Sonata in G major
 QV 1:102 – Flute Sonata No. 309 in G major
 QV 1:103 – Flute Sonata No. 350 in G major
 QV 1:104 – Flute Sonata No. 254 in G major
 QV 1:105 – Flute Sonata No. 343 in G major
 QV 1:106 – Flute Sonata No. 329 in G major
 QV 1:107 – Flute Sonata No. 88 in G major
 QV 1:108a – Flute Sonata in G major
 QV 1:108b – Oboe Sonata in E flat major
 QV 1:109 – Flute Sonata No. 273 in G major
 QV 1:110 – Flute Sonata No. 246 in G major
 QV 1:111 – Flute Sonata No. 232 in G major
 QV 1:112 – Flute Sonata No. 295 in G major
 QV 1:113 – Flute Sonata No. 236 in G major
 QV 1:114 – Flute Sonata No. 233 in G minor
 QV 1:115 – Flute Sonata No. 281 in G minor
 QV 1:116 – Flute Sonata XIV in G minor
 QV 1:117 – Flute Sonata No. 315 in G minor
 QV 1:118 – Flute Sonata No. 288 in G minor
 QV 1:119 – Flute Sonata No. 265 in G minor
 QV 1:120 – Flute Sonata No. 357 in G minor
 QV 1:121 – Flute Sonata XX in G minor
 QV 1:122 – Flute Sonata No. 271 in G minor
 QV 1:123 – Flute Sonata No. 237 in G minor
 QV 1:124 – Flute Sonata No. 302 in G minor
 QV 1:125 – Flute Sonata VII in G minor
 QV 1:126 – Flute Sonata No. 336 in G minor
 QV 1:127 – Flute Sonata No. 322 in G minor
 QV 1:128 – Flute Sonata No. 142 in G minor
 QV 1:129 – Flute Sonata No. 323 in A major
 QV 1:130 – Flute Sonata No. 289 in A major
 QV 1:131 – Flute Sonata No. 337 in A major
 QV 1:132 – Flute Sonata No. 358 in A major
 QV 1:133 – Flute Sonata No. 224 in A major
 QV 1:134 – Flute Sonata No. 222 in A major
 QV 1:135 – Flute Sonata No. 282 in A major
 QV 1:136 – Flute Sonata No. 296 in A major
 QV 1:137 – Flute Sonata No. 310 in A major
 QV 1:138 – Flute Sonata No. 239 in A major
 QV 1:139 – Flute Sonata No. 344 in A major
 QV 1:140 – Flute Sonata No. 330 in A major
 QV 1:141 – Flute Sonata No. 316 in A major
 QV 1:142 – Flute Sonata No. 266 in A major
 QV 1:143 – Flute Sonata No. 351 in A major
 QV 1:144 – Flute Sonata No. 303 in A major
 QV 1:145 – Flute Sonata No. 274 in A major
 QV 1:146 – Flute Sonata I in A minor
 QV 1:147 – Flute Sonata No. 99 in A minor
 QV 1:148 – Flute Sonata No. 248 in A minor
 QV 1:149 – Flute Sonata No. 235 in A minor
 QV 1:150 – Flute Sonata No. 230 in A minor
 QV 1:151 – Flute Sonata No. 105 in A minor
 QV 1:152 – Flute Sonata in A minor, Op. 1 No. 1
 QV 1:153 – Flute Sonata No. 102 in B flat major, Op. 1 No. 2
 QV 1:154 – Flute Sonata No. 345 in B flat major
 QV 1:155 – Flute Sonata No. 304 in B flat major
 QV 1:156 – Flute Sonata No. 249 in B flat major
 QV 1:157 – Flute Sonata No. 352 in B flat major
 QV 1:158 – Flute Sonata No. 290 in B flat major
 QV 1:159 – Flute Sonata No. 324 in B flat major
 QV 1:160 – Flute Sonata No. 338 in B flat major
 QV 1:161 – Flute Sonata No. 275 in B flat major
 QV 1:162 – Flute Sonata No. 317 in B flat major
 QV 1:163 – Flute Sonata II in B flat major
 QV 1:164 – Flute Sonata No. 90 in B flat major
 QV 1:165 – Flute Sonata No. 331 in B minor
 QV 1:166 – Flute Sonata No. 311 in B minor
 QV 1:167 – Flute Sonata No. 104 in B minor
 QV 1:168 – Flute Sonata No. 231 in B minor
 QV 1:169 – Flute Sonata No. 267 in B minor
 QV 1:170 – Flute Sonata No. 283 in B minor
 QV 1:171 – Flute Sonata XI in B minor
 QV 1:172 – Flute Sonata No. 203 in B minor
 QV 1:173 – Flute Sonata No. 100 in B minor
 QV 1:174 – Flute Sonata No. 297 in B minor
 QV 1:175 – Flute Sonata No. 359 in B minor
 QV 1:176 – Flute Sonata No. 240 in B minor
 QV 1:177 – Pieces for flute & continuo I
 QV 1:178 – Pieces for flute & continuo II
 QV 1:179 – Flute Sonata in C minor
 QV 1:180 – Flute Sonata in G major
 QV 1:181 – Flute Sonata in G major
 QV 1:182 – Flute Sonata in E minor
 QV 1:183 – Flute Sonata in G minor
 QV 1:184 – Flute Sonata in D major
 QV 1:Anh. 1 – Flute Sonata in C major (lost)
 QV 1:Anh. 2 – Flute Sonata in C major
 QV 1:Anh. 3 – Flute Sonata in C major
 QV 1:Anh. 4 – Flute Sonata in C major
 QV 1:Anh. 5 – Flute Sonata in C minor
 QV 1:Anh. 6 – Flute Sonata in D major
 QV 1:Anh. 7 – Flute Sonata in D major (lost)
 QV 1:Anh. 8 – Flute Sonata in D major
 QV 1:Anh. 9a – Flute Sonata in D major
 QV 1:Anh. 9b – Flute Sonata in D major
 QV 1:Anh.10 – Flute Sonata in D major
 QV 1:Anh.11 – Flute Sonata in D major (lost)
 QV 1:Anh.12 – Flute Sonata in D major
 QV 1:Anh.13 – Flute Sonata in D major
 QV 1:Anh.14a – Flute Sonata in D major
 QV 1:Anh.14b – Flute Sonata in D major
 QV 1:Anh.15 – Flute Sonata in D major
 QV 1:Anh.16 – Flute Sonata in D minor
 QV 1:Anh.17 – Flute Sonata in E flat major (lost)
 QV 1:Anh.18 – Flute Sonata in E minor
 QV 1:Anh.19 – Flute Sonata in E minor
 QV 1:Anh.20 – Flute Sonata in E minor
 QV 1:Anh.21 – Flute Sonata in E minor
 QV 1:Anh.22 – Flute Sonata in E minor
 QV 1:Anh.23 – Flute Sonata in E minor
 QV 1:Anh.24 – Flute Sonata in G major
 QV 1:Anh.25 – Flute Sonata in G major
 QV 1:Anh.26 – Flute Sonata in G major
 QV 1:Anh.27 – Flute Sonata in G major
 QV 1:Anh.28 – Flute Sonata in G major (lost)
 QV 1:Anh.29 – Flute Sonata in G major
 QV 1:Anh.30 – Flute Sonata in G major
 QV 1:Anh.31 – Flute Sonata in G major
 QV 1:Anh.32 – Flute Sonata in G major
 QV 1:Anh.33 – Flute Sonata in G major
 QV 1:Anh.34 – Flute Sonata in G major
 QV 1:Anh.35 – Flute Sonata in G major
 QV 1:Anh.36 – Flute Sonata in G major
 QV 1:Anh.37 – Flute Sonata in A minor
 QV 1:Anh.38 – Flute Sonata in A minor
 QV 1:Anh.39 – Bassoon Sonata in B flat major
 QV 1:Anh.40 – Oboe Sonata in B flat major (lost)
 QV 1:Anh.41 – Flute Sonata in B major
 QV 1:Anh.42 – Flute Sonata in B minor
 QV 1:Anh.43 – Flute Sonata in B minor
 QV 1:Anh.44 – Flute Sonata in B minor
 QV 1:Anh.45 – 4 Flute Sonatas

Trio sonatas

The variable instrumentation of the trio sonatas in indicated in parentheses. Some of the trio sonatas call for two instruments only with the harpsichord playing one dessus and the continuo. For example, 'Sonata for flute, (violin) & harpsichord (continuo)' means that it can be played by flute, violin and continuo or flute and harpsichord.

 QV 2: 1 – Sonata for flute, violin (flute) & continuo Op. 3 No. 3 in C major
 QV 2: 2 – Sonata for flute, recorder & continuo in C major
 QV 2: 3 – Sonata for 2 flutes & continuo in C minor
 QV 2: 4 – Sonata for flute, viola d'amore & continuo in C minor
 QV 2: 5 – Sonata for flute, oboe & continuo in C minor
 QV 2: 6 – Sonata for 2 flutes & continuo Op. 3 No. 2 in D major
 QV 2: 7 – Sonata for 2 flutes & continuo in D major
 QV 2: 8 – Sonata for 2 flutes & continuo in D major
 QV 2: 9 – Sonata for flute, violin & continuo in D major
 QV 2:10 – Sonata for flute, violin & continuo Op. 3 No. 6 in D major
 QV 2:11 – Sonata for 2 flutes & continuo in D major (lost)
 QV 2:12 – Sonata for 2 flutes & continuo in D major
 QV 2:13 – Sonata for 2 flutes & continuo in D major
 QV 2:14 – Sonata for flute, (violin) & harpsichord (continuo) in D major
 QV 2:15 – Sonata for 2 flutes & continuo in D major
 QV 2:16 – Sonata for flute, violin & continuo in D minor
 QV 2:17 – Sonata for 2 flutes & continuo in E flat major
 QV 2:18 – Sonata for flute, (violin) & harpsichord (continuo) in E flat major
 QV 2:19 – Sonata for 2 flutes & continuo in E minor
 QV 2:20 – Sonata for flute, violin & continuo in E minor
 QV 2:21 – Sonata for flute, (violin) & harpsichord (continuo) in E minor
 QV 2:22 – Sonata for flute, violin (flute) & continuo in E minor
 QV 2:23 – Sonata for 2 flutes, oboes or violins & continuo Op. 3 No. 5 in E minor
 QV 2:24 – Sonata for flute, (violin) & harpsichord (continuo) in F major
 QV 2:25 – Sonata for flute, violin (flute) & continuo in F minor
 QV 2:26 – Sonata for flute, oboe d'amore (violin) & continuo in G major
 QV 2:27 – Sonata for oboe, violin & continuo in G major
 QV 2:28 – Sonata for flute, (violin) & harpsichord (continuo) in G major
 QV 2:29 – Sonata for flute, violin & continuo in G major
 QV 2:30 – Sonata for oboe, cello (bassoon) & continuo in G major
 QV 2:31 – Sonata for flute, oboe (violin) & continuo Op. 3 No. 1 in G major
 QV 2:32 – Sonata for 2 flutes & continuo Op. 3 No. 4 in G major
 QV 2:33 – Sonata for flute, violin (flute) & continuo in G major
 QV 2:34 – Sonata for flute, violin & continuo in G minor
 QV 2:35 – Sonata for flute, (violin) & harpsichord (continuo) in G minor
 QV 2:36 – Sonata for 2 flutes & continuo in A major
 QV 2:37 – Sonata for 2 violins (flutes) & continuo in A major
 QV 2:38 – Sonata for 2 flutes, oboes or violins & continuo in A major
 QV 2:39 – Sonata for flute, violin (flute) & continuo in A minor
 QV 2:40 – Sonata for 2 flutes & continuo in A minor
 QV 2:41a – Sonata for 2 flutes & continuo in A minor
 QV 2:41b – Sonata for 2 oboes & continuo in G minor
 QV 2:42 – Sonata for flute, violin (flute) & continuo in B flat major
 QV 2:43 – Sonata for flute, violin (flute) & continuo in B minor
 QV 2:Anh.1 – March for 2 oboes & bassoon in E flat major
 QV 2:Anh.2 – Sonata for 2 flutes (oboe & violin) & continuo in E minor
 QV 2:Anh.3 – Sonata for flute, violin (flute) & continuo in G major
 QV 2:Anh.4 – Sonata for flute, violin & continuo in G major

Flute Solos

The third group of compositions gathers works for 1 to 3 flutes without continuo.

 QV 3:1. 1 – Fantasia for flute solo in C major
 QV 3:1. 2 – Fantasia for flute solo in C major
 QV 3:1. 3 – Vivace alla Francese for flute solo in D major
 QV 3:1. 4 – Capricio for flute solo in D major
 QV 3:1. 5 – Fantasia for flute solo in D major
 QV 3:1. 6 – Capricio for flute solo in D major
 QV 3:1. 7 – Praeludium for flute solo in D major
 QV 3:1. 8 – Capricio I for flute solo in D minor
 QV 3:1. 9 – Fantasia for flute solo in E minor
 QV 3:1.10 – Capricio II for flute solo in E minor
 QV 3:1.11 – Fantasia for flute solo in E minor
 QV 3:1.12 – Capricio for flute solo in F major
 QV 3:1.13 – Capricio for flute solo in G major
 QV 3:1.14 – Capricio VI for flute solo in G major
 QV 3:1.15 – Capricio IV for flute solo in G major
 QV 3:1.16 – Allegretto con variazioni for flute solo in G major
 QV 3:1.17 – Capricio V for flute solo in G major
 QV 3:1.18 – Presto for flute solo in G major
 QV 3:1.19 – Capricio VII for flute solo in A minor
 QV 3:1.20 – Menuetto for flute solo in B flat major
 QV 3:1.21 – Capricio VIII for flute solo in B flat major
 QV 3:1.22 – Adagio for flute solo in B minor
 QV 3:1.23 – Presto for flute solo in B minor
 QV 3:1.24 – Fantasia for flute solo in B minor
 QV 3:2.1 – Flute Duet Op. 2 No. 4 in C major
 QV 3:2.2 – Flute Duet Op. 2 No. 5 in D major
 QV 3:2.3 – Flute Duet Op. 2 No. 6 in E minor
 QV 3:2.4 – Flute Duet Op. 2 No. 1 in G major
 QV 3:2.5 – Flute Duet Op. 2 No. 2 in A minor
 QV 3:2.6 – Flute Duet Op. 2 No. 3 in B minor
 QV 3:2.Anh. 1 – Minuet for flute duet in D major
 QV 3:2.Anh. 2 – Flute Duet Op. 5 No. 3 in D major
 QV 3:2.Anh. 3 – Flute Duet Op. 5 No. 2 in D major
 QV 3:2.Anh. 4 – Flute Duet Op. 5 No. 6 in E minor
 QV 3:2.Anh. 5 – Flute Duet Op. 5 No. 4 in G major
 QV 3:2.Anh. 6 – Flute Duet Op. 5 No. 1 in A major
 QV 3:2.Anh. 7 – Flute Duet Op. 5 No. 5 in A minor
 QV 3:2.Anh. 8 – 7 duets for flute
 QV 3:2.Anh. 9 – 6 duets for flute (lost)
 QV 3:2.Anh.10 – 9 Duettino for flutes
 QV 3:3.1 – Sonata for 3 flutes in D major
 QV 3:3.2 – Sonata for 3 flutes in D major
 QV 3:3.3 – Sonata for 3 flutes in D major

Flute concertos

Like the flute sonatas, the concertos are numbered according to the catalogues contemporary to Quantz, especially the Catalogue des concertos pour le Nouveau Palais. Quantz composed the concertos Nos. 1, 4–78, 80–85, 89 and 92–300. Frederick II composed only four concertos, Nos. 87, 88, 90 and 91. The concerto No. 2 is by Carl Heinrich Graun. As for the concertos Nos. 3, 79 and 86, the composer remains unknown.
The flute concertos are listed in two categories, whether or not a viola part is included in the string accompaniment.

Flute concertos without viola part

Instrumentation: Flute, solo; 2 violins and basso continuo.

 QV 4:1 – Concerto No. 14 for flute in D major
 QV 4:2 – Concerto No. 25 for flute in E flat major
 QV 4:3 – Concerto No. 13 for flute in E minor
 QV 4:4 – Concerto No. 11 for flute in G major
 QV 4:5 – Concerto No. 69 for flute in G major
 QV 4:6 – Concerto No. 12 for flute in A major
 QV 4:7 – Concerto No. 102 for flute in B minor

Flute concertos with viola part

Instrumentation: Flute, solo; 2 violins, viola and basso continuo.

 QV 5: 1 – Concerto No. 72 for flute in C major
 QV 5: 2 – Concerto No. 71 for flute in C major
 QV 5: 3 – Concerto No. 100 for flute in C major (lost)
 QV 5: 4 – Concerto No. 202 for flute in C major
 QV 5: 5 – Concerto No. 94 for flute in C major
 QV 5: 6 – Concerto No. 156 for flute in C major
 QV 5: 7 – Concerto No. 237 for flute in C major
 QV 5: 8 – Concerto No. 24 for flute in C major
 QV 5: 9 – Concerto No. 63 for flute in C major (lost)
 QV 5: 10 – Concerto No. 118 for flute in C major
 QV 5: 11 – Concerto No. 134 for flute in C major
 QV 5: 12 – Concerto No. 223 for flute in C major
 QV 5: 13 – Concerto No. 23 for flute in C major
 QV 5: 14 – Concerto No. 137 for flute in C major
 QV 5: 15 – Concerto No. 188 for flute in C major
 QV 5: 16 – Concerto No. 293 for flute in C major
 QV 5: 17 – Concerto No. 265 for flute in C major
 QV 5: 18 – Concerto No. 172 for flute in C major (lost)
 QV 5: 19 – Concerto No. 36 for flute in C major
 QV 5: 20 – Concerto No. 279 for flute in C major
 QV 5: 21 – Concerto No. 251 for flute in C major
 QV 5: 22 – Concerto No. 209 for flute in C major
 QV 5: 23 – Concerto No. 272 for flute in C major
 QV 5: 24 – Concerto No. 244 for flute in C minor
 QV 5: 25 – Concerto No. 216 for flute in C minor
 QV 5: 26 – Concerto No. 153 for flute in C minor
 QV 5: 27 – Concerto No. 53 for flute in C minor (lost)
 QV 5: 28 – Concerto No. 181 for flute in C minor
 QV 5: 29 – Concerto No. 164 for flute in C minor (lost)
 QV 5: 30 – Concerto No. 119 for flute in C minor (lost)
 QV 5: 31 – Concerto No. 54 for flute in C minor (lost)
 QV 5: 32 – Concerto No. 108 for flute in C minor
 QV 5: 33 – Concerto No. 230 for flute in C minor
 QV 5: 34 – Concerto No. 258 for flute in C minor
 QV 5: 35 – Concerto No. 147 for flute in C minor
 QV 5: 36 – Concerto No. 7 for flute in C minor
 QV 5: 37 – Concerto No. 286 for flute in C minor
 QV 5: 38 – Concerto No. 300 for flute in C minor
 QV 5: 39 – Concerto No. 195 for flute in C minor
 QV 5: 40 – Concerto No. 26 for flute in D major
 QV 5: 41 – Concerto No. 182 for flute in D major
 QV 5: 42 – Concerto No. 101 for flute in D major (lost)
 QV 5: 43 – Concerto No. 40 for flute in D major
 QV 5: 44 – Concerto No. 231 for flute in D major
 QV 5: 45 – Concerto No. 144 for flute in D major
 QV 5: 46 – Concerto No. 116 for flute in D major
 QV 5: 47 – Concerto No. 92 for flute in D major
 QV 5: 48 – Concerto No. 78 for flute in D major
 QV 5: 49 – Concerto No. 45 for flute in D major
 QV 5: 50 – Concerto No. 259 for flute in D major
 QV 5: 51 – Concerto No. 82 for flute in D major (1st version)
 QV 5: 52 – Concerto No. 82 for flute in D major (2nd version)
 QV 5: 53 – Concerto No. 28 for flute in D major
 QV 5: 54 – Concerto No. 17 for flute in D major
 QV 5: 55 – Concerto No. 127 for flute in D major
 QV 5: 56 – Concerto No. 110 for flute in D major (lost)
 QV 5: 57 – Concerto No. 42 for flute in D major
 QV 5: 58 – Concerto No. 75 for flute in D major
 QV 5: 59 – Concerto No. 217 for flute in D major
 QV 5: 60 – Concerto No. 203 for flute in D major
 QV 5: 61 – Concerto No. 294 for flute in D major
 QV 5: 62 – Concerto No. 41 for flute in D major
 QV 5: 63 – Concerto No. 224 for flute in D major
 QV 5: 64 – Concerto No. 252 for flute in D major
 QV 5: 65 – Concerto No. 238 for flute in D major
 QV 5: 66 – Concerto No. 157 for flute in D major
 QV 5: 67 – Concerto No. 266 for flute in D major
 QV 5: 68 – Concerto No. 245 for flute in D major
 QV 5: 69 – Concerto No. 22 for flute in D major
 QV 5: 70 – Concerto No. 173 for flute in D major (lost)
 QV 5: 71 – Concerto No. 196 for flute in D major
 QV 5: 72 – Concerto No. 280 for flute in D major
 QV 5: 73 – Concerto No. 15 for flute in D major
 QV 5: 74 – Concerto No. 70 for flute in D major
 QV 5: 75 – Concerto No. 29 for flute in D major
 QV 5: 76 – Concerto No. 210 for flute in D major
 QV 5: 77 – Concerto No. 287 for flute in D major
 QV 5: 78 – Concerto No. 273 for flute in D major
 QV 5: 79 – Concerto No. 121 for flute in D minor (lost)
 QV 5: 80 – Concerto No. 30 for flute in D minor
 QV 5: 81 – Concerto No. 113 for flute in D minor
 QV 5: 82 – Concerto No. 189 for flute in D minor
 QV 5: 83 – Concerto No. 37 for flute in D minor
 QV 5: 84 – Concerto No. 165 for flute in D minor (lost)
 QV 5: 85 – Concerto No. 140 for flute in D minor
 QV 5: 86 – Concerto No. 38 for flute in D minor
 QV 5: 87 – Concerto No. 73 for flute in D minor
 QV 5: 88 – Concerto No. 139 for flute in D minor
 QV 5: 89 – Concerto No. 109 for flute in E flat major
 QV 5: 90 – Concerto No. 260 for flute in E flat major
 QV 5: 91 – Concerto No. 175 for flute in E flat major (lost)
 QV 5: 92 – Concerto No. 55 for flute in E flat major (lost)
 QV 5: 93 – Concerto No. 143 for flute in E flat major
 QV 5: 94 – Concerto No. 211 for flute in E flat major
 QV 5: 95 – Concerto No. 159 for flute in E flat major
 QV 5: 96 – Concerto No. 122 for flute in E flat major (lost)
 QV 5: 97 – Concerto No. 246 for flute in E flat major
 QV 5: 98 – Concerto No. 267 for flute in E flat major
 QV 5: 99 – Concerto No. 281 for flute in E flat major
 QV 5:100 – Concerto No. 218 for flute in E flat major
 QV 5:101 – Concerto No. 8 for flute in E flat major
 QV 5:102 – Concerto No. 190 for flute in E flat major
 QV 5:103 – Concerto No. 204 for flute in E flat major
 QV 5:104 – Concerto No. 232 for flute in E flat major
 QV 5:105 – Concerto No. 166 for flute in E flat major (lost)
 QV 5:106 – Concerto No. 288 for flute in E flat major
 QV 5:107 – Concerto No. 178 for flute in E major
 QV 5:108 – Concerto No. 146 for flute in E major
 QV 5:109 – Concerto No. 112 for flute in E minor (lost)
 QV 5:110 – Concerto No. 274 for flute in E minor
 QV 5:111 – Concerto No. 158 for flute in E minor
 QV 5:112 – Concerto No. 197 for flute in E minor
 QV 5:113 – Concerto No. 21 for flute in E minor
 QV 5:114 – Concerto No. 167 for flute in E minor (lost)
 QV 5:115 – Concerto No. 160 for flute in E minor
 QV 5:116 – Concerto No. 114 for flute in E minor
 QV 5:117 – Concerto No. 129 for flute in E minor
 QV 5:118 – Concerto No. 1 for flute in E minor
 QV 5:119 – Concerto No. 62 for flute in E minor (lost)
 QV 5:120 – Concerto No. 57 for flute in E minor
 QV 5:121 – Concerto No. 83 for flute in E minor
 QV 5:122 – Concerto No. 225 for flute in E minor
 QV 5:123 – Concerto No. 142 for flute in E minor
 QV 5:124 – Concerto No. 95 for flute in E minor
 QV 5:125 – Concerto No. 174 for flute in E minor (lost)
 QV 5:126 – Concerto No. 253 for flute in E minor
 QV 5:127 – Concerto No. 32 for flute in E minor
 QV 5:128 – Concerto No. 10 for flute in E minor
 QV 5:129 – Concerto No. 131 for flute in E minor
 QV 5:130 – Concerto No. 183 for flute in E minor
 QV 5:131 – Concerto No. 80 for flute in E minor
 QV 5:132 – Concerto No. 39 for flute in E minor
 QV 5:133 – Concerto No. 239 for flute in E minor
 QV 5:134 – Concerto No. 48 for flute in E minor (lost)
 QV 5:135 – Concerto No. 33 for flute in E minor
 QV 5:136 – Concerto No. 93 for flute in E minor
 QV 5:137 – Concerto No. 295 for flute in E minor
 QV 5:138 – Concerto No. 6 for flute in F major
 QV 5:139 – Concerto No. 103 for flute in F major
 QV 5:140 – Concerto No. 176 for flute in F major (lost)
 QV 5:141 – Concerto No. 254 for flute in F major
 QV 5:142 – Concerto No. 168 for flute in F major (lost)
 QV 5:143 – Concerto No. 126 for flute in F major
 QV 5:144 – Concerto No. 135 for flute in F major
 QV 5:145 – Concerto No. 247 for flute in F major
 QV 5:146 – Concerto No. 138 for flute in F major
 QV 5:147 – Concerto No. 240 for flute in F major
 QV 5:148 – Concerto No. 44 for flute in F major
 QV 5:149 – Concerto No. 191 for flute in F major
 QV 5:150 – Concerto No. 233 for flute in F major
 QV 5:151 – Concerto No. 212 for flute in F major
 QV 5:152 – Concerto No. 219 for flute in F major
 QV 5:153 – Concerto No. 282 for flute in F major
 QV 5:154 – Concerto No. 296 for flute in F major
 QV 5:155 – Concerto No. 205 for flute in F major
 QV 5:156 – Concerto No. 261 for flute in F major
 QV 5:157 – Concerto No. 275 for flute in F major
 QV 5:158 – Concerto No. 268 for flute in F major
 QV 5:159 – Concerto No. 226 for flute in F major
 QV 5:160 – Concerto No. 154 for flute in F major
 QV 5:161 – Concerto No. 198 for flute in F major
 QV 5:162 – Concerto No. 184 for flute in F major
 QV 5:163 – Concerto No. 289 for flute in F major
 QV 5:164 – Concerto No. 50 for flute in G major (lost)
 QV 5:165 – Concerto No. 151 for flute in G major
 QV 5:166 – Concerto No. 117 for flute in G major (lost)
 QV 5:167 – Concerto No. 81 for flute in G major
 QV 5:168 – Concerto No. 27 for flute in G major
 QV 5:169 – Concerto No. 128 for flute in G major
 QV 5:170 – Concerto No. 96 for flute in G major
 QV 5:171 – Concerto No. 107 for flute in G major (lost)
 QV 5:172 – Concerto No. 98 for flute in G major
 QV 5:173 – Concerto No. 84 for flute in G major (= Mus.ms 18 019/32 [No. 29])
 QV 5:174 – Concerto No. 161 for flute in G major
 QV 5:175 – Concerto No. 241 for flute in G major
 QV 5:176 – Concerto No. 136 for flute in G major
 QV 5:177 – Concerto No. 213 for flute in G major
 QV 5:178 – Concerto No. 104 for flute in G major
 QV 5:179 – Concerto No. 20 for flute in G major
 QV 5:180 – Concerto No. 192 for flute in G major
 QV 5:181 – Concerto No. 148 for flute in G major
 QV 5:182 – Concerto No. 283 for flute in G major
 QV 5:183 – Concerto No. 35 for flute in G major
 QV 5:184 – Concerto No. 58 for flute in G major
 QV 5:185 – Concerto No. 68 for flute in G major
 QV 5:186 – Concerto No. 177 for flute in G major
 QV 5:187 – Concerto No. 276 for flute in G major
 QV 5:188 – Concerto No. 66 for flute in G major
 QV 5:189 – Concerto No. 227 for flute in G major
 QV 5:190 – Concerto No. 206 for flute in G major
 QV 5:191 – Concerto No. 255 for flute in G major
 QV 5:192 – Concerto No. 297 for flute in G minor
 QV 5:193 – Concerto No. 132 for flute in G minor
 QV 5:194 – Concerto No. 234 for flute in G minor
 QV 5:195 – Concerto No. 248 for flute in G minor
 QV 5:196 – Concerto No. 262 for flute in G minor
 QV 5:197 – Concerto No. 115 for flute in G minor (lost)
 QV 5:198 – Concerto No. 169 for flute in G minor (lost)
 QV 5:199 – Concerto No. 52 for flute in G minor (lost)
 QV 5:200 – Concerto No. 290 for flute in G minor
 QV 5:201 – Concerto No. 185 for flute in G minor
 QV 5:202 – Concerto No. 43 for flute in G minor
 QV 5:203 – Concerto No. 220 for flute in G minor
 QV 5:204 – Concerto No. 150 for flute in G minor
 QV 5:205 – Concerto No. 19 for flute in G minor
 QV 5:206 – Concerto No. 97 for flute in G minor
 QV 5:207 – Concerto No. 199 for flute in G minor
 QV 5:208 – Concerto No. 269 for flute in G minor
 QV 5:209 – Concerto No. 67 for flute in A major
 QV 5:210 – Concerto No. 76 for flute in A major
 QV 5:211 – Concerto No. 242 for flute in A major
 QV 5:212 – Concerto No. 221 for flute in A major
 QV 5:213 – Concerto No. 125 for flute in A major
 QV 5:214 – Concerto No. 130 for flute in A major
 QV 5:215 – Concerto No. 214 for flute in A major
 QV 5:216 – Concerto No. 249 for flute in A major
 QV 5:217 – Concerto No. 186 for flute in A major
 QV 5:218 – Concerto No. 85 for flute in A major
 QV 5:219 – Concerto No. 64 for flute in A major (lost)
 QV 5:220 – Concerto No. 298 for flute in A major
 QV 5:221 – Concerto No. 270 for flute in A major
 QV 5:222 – Concerto No. 152 for flute in A major
 QV 5:223 – Concerto No. 200 for flute in A major
 QV 5:224 – Concerto No. 256 for flute in A major
 QV 5:225 – Concerto No. 111 for flute in A major
 QV 5:226 – Concerto No. 291 for flute in A major
 QV 5:227 – Concerto No. 263 for flute in A major
 QV 5:228 – Concerto No. 277 for flute in A major
 QV 5:229 – Concerto No. 170 for flute in A major (lost)
 QV 5:230 – Concerto No. 207 for flute in A major
 QV 5:231 – Concerto No. 235 for flute in A major
 QV 5:232 – Concerto No. 284 for flute in A major
 QV 5:233 – Concerto No. 149 for flute in A minor
 QV 5:234 – Concerto No. 162 for flute in A minor
 QV 5:235 – Concerto No. 105 for flute in A minor (lost)
 QV 5:236 – Concerto No. 193 for flute in A minor
 QV 5:237 – Concerto No. 228 for flute in A minor
 QV 5:238 – Concerto No. 123 for flute in A minor (lost)
 QV 5:239 – Concerto No. 34 for flute in A minor
 QV 5:240 – Concerto No. 179 for flute in A minor
 QV 5:241 – Concerto No. 49 for flute in A minor (lost)
 QV 5:242 – Concerto No. 16 for flute in A minor
 QV 5:243 – Concerto No. 9 for flute in B flat major
 QV 5:244 – Concerto No. 243 for flute in B flat major
 QV 5:245 – Concerto No. 180 for flute in B flat major
 QV 5:246 – Concerto No. 133 for flute in B flat major
 QV 5:247 – Concerto No. 163 for flute in B flat major (lost)
 QV 5:248 – Concerto No. 106 for flute in B flat major
 QV 5:249 – Concerto No. 124 for flute in B flat major (lost)
 QV 5:250 – Concerto No. 51 for flute in B flat major (lost)
 QV 5:251 – Concerto No. 278 for flute in B flat major
 QV 5:252 – Concerto No. 257 for flute in B flat major
 QV 5:253 – Concerto No. 155 for flute in B flat major
 QV 5:254 – Concerto No. 215 for flute in B flat major
 QV 5:255 – Concerto No. 208 for flute in B flat major
 QV 5:256 – Concerto No. 271 for flute in B flat major
 QV 5:257 – Concerto No. 229 for flute in B flat major
 QV 5:258 – Concerto No. 292 for flute in B flat major
 QV 5:259 – Concerto No. 194 for flute in B flat major
 QV 5:260 – Concerto No. 299 for flute in B flat major
 QV 5:261 – Concerto No. 65 for flute in B minor
 QV 5:262 – Concerto No. 77 for flute in B minor
 QV 5:263 – Concerto No. 5 for flute in B minor
 QV 5:264 – Concerto No. 250 for flute in B minor
 QV 5:265 – Concerto No. 61 for flute in B minor (lost)
 QV 5:266 – Concerto No. 120 for flute in B minor (lost)
 QV 5:267 – Concerto No. 47 for flute in B minor
 QV 5:268 – Concerto No. 141 for flute in B minor
 QV 5:269 – Concerto No. 145 for flute in B minor
 QV 5:270 – Concerto No. 99 for flute in B minor
 QV 5:271 – Concerto No. 201 for flute in B minor
 QV 5:272 – Concerto No. 187 for flute in B minor
 QV 5:273 – Concerto No. 56 for flute in B minor (lost)
 QV 5:274 – Concerto No. 264 for flute in B minor
 QV 5:275 – Concerto No. 285 for flute in B minor
 QV 5:276 – Concerto No. 74 for flute in B minor
 QV 5:277 – Concerto No. 171 for flute in B minor (lost)
 QV 5:278 – Concerto No. 18 for flute in B minor
 QV 5:279 – Concerto No. 46 for flute in B minor
 QV 5:280 – Concerto No. 222 for flute in B minor
 QV 5:281 – Concerto No. 236 for flute in B minor
 QV 5:Anh. 1 – Concerto for flute in C major
 QV 5:Anh. 2 – Concerto No. 86 for flute in C major
 QV 5:Anh. 3 – Concerto for flute in C major (lost)
 QV 5:Anh. 4 – Concerto for flute in C minor (lost)
 QV 5:Anh. 5 – Concerto No. 3 for flute in D major (lost)
 QV 5:Anh. 6 – Concerto for flute in D major
 QV 5:Anh. 7 – Concerto for flute in D major (lost)
 QV 5:Anh. 8 – Concerto for flute in D major
 QV 5:Anh. 9 – Concerto for flute in D major
 QV 5:Anh.10 – Concerto for flute in D major
 QV 5:Anh.11 – Concerto for oboe in D minor
 QV 5:Anh.12 – Concerto for horn in E flat major (by Melchior Hoffmann)
 QV 5:Anh.13 – Concerto for horn in E flat major
 QV 5:Anh.14 – Concerto for horn in E flat major
 QV 5:Anh.15 – Concerto for flute in E minor
 QV 5:Anh.16 – Concerto for oboe in F major (lost)
 QV 5:Anh.17 – Concerto No. 2 for flute in G major
 QV 5:Anh.18 – Concerto for flute in G major
 QV 5:Anh.19 – Concerto for flute in G major
 QV 5:Anh.20 – Concerto for flute in G major
 QV 5:Anh.21 – Concerto for flute in G major (lost)
 QV 5:Anh.22 – Concerto for flute in G major (Adam)
 QV 5:Anh.23 – Concerto for flute in A major (lost)
 QV 5:Anh.24 – Concerto No. 79 for flute in A major
 QV 5:Anh.25 – Concerto for oboe in B flat major
 QV 5:Anh.26 – Concerto for flute in B minor

Other orchestral works
 QV 6:1 – Concerto No. 60 for 2 flutes in D major
 QV 6:2 – Concerto for flute & violin in D major
 QV 6:3 – Concerto No. 59 for flute, oboe and violin in E minor
 QV 6:4 – Pastorale in G major
 QV 6:5 – Concerto No. 89 for 2 flutes in G major
 QV 6:6 – Concerto No. 4 a 10 in G major
 QV 6:7 – Concerto for 2 flutes in G major
 QV 6:8 – Concerto for 2 flutes in G minor
 QV 6:Anh.1 – Sinfonia in D major
 QV 6:Anh.2 – Concerto a 10 in G major

Arias and songs
 QV 7: 1 – Aria for soprano: Sembra che il ruscelletto in D major
 QV 7: 2 – Aria for soprano: Padre perdona in E flat major
 QV 7: 3 – Lied: Die Wahl einer Geliebten in C major
 QV 7: 4 – Lied: Die geliebte Verzweiflung in E flat major
 QV 7: 5 – Lied: Die Vergötterung in G major
 QV 7: 6 – Lied: An eine kleine Schöne in G major
 QV 7: 7 – Lied: Das Pantheon in B flat major
 QV 7: 8 – Lied: Der Durstige in B flat major
 QV 7: 9 – Lied: Die Liebe der Feinde in C major
 QV 7:10 – Lied: Trost eines schwermüthigen Christen in C minor
 QV 7:11 – Lied: Das Gebet in D major
 QV 7:12 – Lied: Danklied in D major
 QV 7:13 – Lied: Auf die Himmelfahrt des Erlösers in D major
 QV 7:14 – Lied: Trost der Erlösung in D minor
 QV 7:15 – Lied: Von der Quelle der guten Werke in E flat major
 QV 7:16 – Lied: Die Ehre Gottes aus der Natur in E major
 QV 7:17 – Lied: Zufriedenheit mit seinem Zustande in E minor
 QV 7:18 – Lied: Warnung vor der Wollust in F major
 QV 7:19 – Lied: Erweckung zur Busse in F major
 QV 7:20 – Lied: Das Glück eines guten Gewissens in F major
 QV 7:21 – Lied: Das natürliche Verderben des Menschen in F major
 QV 7:22 – Lied: Der Weg des Frommen in G major
 QV 7:23 – Lied: Beständige Erinnerung des Todes in G major
 QV 7:24 – Lied: Um Ergebung in den göttlichen Willen in G minor
 QV 7:25 – Lied: Die Güte Gottes in A major
 QV 7:26 – Lied: Demuth in A major
 QV 7:27 – Lied: Busslied in A minor
 QV 7:28 – Lied: Am Geburtstage in B flat major
 QV 7:29 – Lied: Wider den ‹bermuth in B flat major
 QV 7:30 – Lied: Gottes Macht und Vorsehung in B flat major
 QV 7:Anh.1 – Lied: An eine kleine Schöne in E major
 QV 7:Anh.2 – Selig sind des Himmels Erben in C minor

Recently discovered works
The six flute quartets were discovered by Mary Ann Oleskiewicz in the Sing-Akademie zu Berlin archives after they were returned to Germany in 2001.

 QV 4:8 – Flute Quartet No. 1 in D major
 QV 4:9 – Flute Quartet No. 2 in E minor
 QV 4:10 – Flute Quartet No. 3 in G major
 QV 4:11 – Flute Quartet No. 4 in G minor
 QV 4:12 – Flute Quartet No. 5 in C major
 QV 4:13 – Flute Quartet No. 6 in B minor

Notes

Quantz, Johann Joachim